Merta Road Junction railway station (station code:- MTD) also known as Merta Road Station which serves Merta Road, India. Approximately 75–100 passenger trains pass through the station each day requiring its 3 platforms and serving more than 8000-10000 passengers per day. The station located around 105 km away from Jodhpur at Jodhpur–Bikaner route. This is a major railway station in Nagaur district, Rajasthan. The platform is semi well sheltered. Almost all facilities are available including water, sanitation.

References

Railway stations in Nagaur district
Jodhpur railway division